The 1911 Tour de France was the 9th edition of Tour de France, one of cycling's Grand Tours. The Tour began in Paris on 2 July and Stage 9 occurred on 18 July with a mountainous stage from Perpignan. The race finished in Paris on 30 July.

Stage 9
18 July 1911 — Perpignan to Luchon,

Stage 10
20 July 1911 — Luchon to Bayonne,

Stage 11
22 July 1911 — Bayonne to La Rochelle,

Stage 12
23 July 1911 — La Rochelle to Brest,

Stage 13
26 July 1911 — Brest to Cherbourg-en-Cotentin,

Stage 14
28 July 1911 — Cherbourg-en-Cotentin to Le Havre,

Stage 15
30 July 1911 — Le Havre to Paris,

References

1911 Tour de France
Tour de France stages